Symmoca minimella is a moth in the family Autostichidae. It was described by Aristide Caradja in 1920. It is found in Russia's Ural Mountains.

References

Moths described in 1920
Symmoca